List of metropolitan areas by population density is a list covering the top 50 most densely populated cities.

See  also 
 List of cities proper by population density

References 

Lists of cities by population
Cities, world